Lutfo Ephraim Dlamini (born 1960) is a politician from Eswatini.

References

1960 births
Living people
People from Hhohho Region
Swazi diplomats
Foreign Ministers of Eswatini
Government ministers of Eswatini